The Minister President of Saxony-Anhalt is the head of government of the German state of Saxony-Anhalt. The office was created in 1990 after the German reunification and the joining of Saxony-Anhalt in the Federal Republic of Germany. The current Minister-President is Reiner Haseloff, heading a coalition government between the Christian Democratic Union, the Social Democratic Party and the Free Democratic Party. Haseloff succeeded Wolfgang Böhmer in April 2011.

The Minister-President's seat of government is known as the State Chancellery and is located in the state capital, Magdeburg, along with the other cabinet department.

List

Saxony-Anhalt (1990–present) 
Political party:

See also
Saxony-Anhalt
Landtag of Saxony-Anhalt

Ministers-President
 
Saxony-Anhalt
Saxony-Anhalt-related lists